Thabiso Nelson Brown (born 3 October 1995) is a Mosotho footballer who plays as a striker for Bolivian side Real Oruro.

International career 
Thabiso scored 5 goals in 4 games and became a top goal scorer of 2015 African U-20 championship qualification tournament. He played first time for Lesotho national team in a match  with Angola. Thabiso scored  his first goal for Lesotho national team in a match with Botswana.

References

External links 
 
 

Living people
Association football forwards
Lesotho footballers
Lesotho international footballers
1995 births
People from Mohale's Hoek District
Lesotho expatriate footballers
Expatriate footballers in Bolivia
Lesotho under-20 international footballers
Lesotho expatriate sportspeople in Bolivia